Mirko Jurkovic (May 19, 1970 – January 9, 2013) was an American football offensive guard who played college football at the University of Notre Dame and attended Thornton Fractional North High School in Calumet City, Illinois. He was drafted by the Chicago Bears in the ninth round of the 1992 NFL Draft.

College career
Jurkovic played for the Notre Dame Fighting Irish football from 1988 to 1991. He was a consensus All-American in 1991. He was a backup lineman on the 1988 Notre Dame Fighting Irish football national championship team. Jurkovic was named Notre Dame lineman of the year by Moose Krause Chapter of the National Football Hall of Fame as a senior in 1991 and played in the Hula Bowl in 1992.

Professional career

Chicago Bears
Jurkovic was selected by the Chicago Bears with the 246th pick in the 1992 NFL Draft.

Personal life
He died of colon cancer on January 9, 2013. He is the brother of NFL player John Jurkovic. His son Mirko Jurkovic, Jr. plays on the offensive line at the University of Georgia. Mirko also had two daughters, Claire and Sammie.

References

External links
Fanbase profile

1970 births
2013 deaths
All-American college football players
American football offensive guards
Deaths from colorectal cancer
Notre Dame Fighting Irish football players
People from Calumet City, Illinois
Players of American football from Illinois
American people of Croatian descent
Deaths from cancer in Indiana